The 2011 Geelong Football Club season was the club's 112th season in the Australian Football League (AFL). Geelong finished the regular season in second position on the ladder with 19 wins and three losses, resulting in qualification for the 2011 AFL finals series. Geelong then proceeded to win its qualifying and preliminary finals in succession to earn a place in the 2011 AFL Grand Final, where it defeated the minor premiers  to claim the AFL Premiership.

Club list

Changes from 2010 list

Additions
 Exchange period (received):
 None
 Promoted rookie:
 James Podsiadly

 Father/son selection:
 None
 2010 AFL Draft (18 November 2010):
 Billie Smedts (Round 1; Overall pick 15; from Geelong Falcons)
 Cameron Guthrie (Round 1; Overall pick 23; from Calder Cannons)
 George Horlin-Smith (Round 2; Overall pick 37; from Sturt)
 Jordan Schroder (Round 3; Overall pick 54; from Calder Cannons)

 2011 Pre-season Draft (7 December 2010):
 None
 2011 Rookie Draft (7 December 2010):
 Josh Walker (Round 1; Overall pick 23; from Geelong Falcons)
 George Burbury (Round 2; Overall pick 40; from Hobart)
 Jonathan Simpkin (Round 3; Overall pick 56; from Geelong VFL)
 Ryan Bathie (Round 4; Overall pick 71; Three-year non-registered selection)

Deletions
 Uncontracted player selection:
 Gary Ablett, Jr. – received two first-round compensation selections (Mid round one and end round one) that can be used in any of the 2011 to 2014 National Drafts.
 Exchange period (traded):
 Delisted:
 Tom Allwright (from Rookie list)
 Ranga Ediriwickrama (from Rookie list)
 Ryan Gamble
 Adam Varcoe (from Rookie list)
 Retirements:
 Max Rooke

Playing list
 Players are listed in alphabetical order by surname, and statistics are for AFL regular season and finals series matches during the 2011 AFL season only.

Season summary

Pre-season matches

NAB Cup

NAB Challenge

Regular season

Finals

Ladder

Teams

Awards and records

 Milestones

 AFL awards

 Records
 Best result from 100 consecutive matches – 85 wins, 15 losses (Round 5, 2007 – Round 4, 2011)
 Best result from 100 consecutive matches – 86 wins, 14 losses (Round 6, 2007 – Round 5, 2011)
 Most consecutive wins at one venue (Skilled Stadium) – 25 wins (Round 3, 2008 – Round 7, 2011)
 Most consecutive wins at one venue (Skilled Stadium) – 26 wins (Round 3, 2008 – Round 11, 2011)
  Most consecutive wins at one venue (Skilled Stadium) – 29 wins (Round 3, 2008 – Round 20, 2011)
  Chris Scott – Most consecutive wins without a loss by a first-year coach – 10 wins (equalled; Round 11, 2011)
 Most streaks of 10 or more wins in VFL/AFL history – 14 streaks (Round 11, 2011)
 Chris Scott – Most consecutive wins without a loss by a first-year coach – 11 wins (Round 12, 2011)
 Most consecutive wins against a club who were victors in the last Grand Final played between the two clubs – six wins against  (Round 1, 2009 – Round 12, 2011)
 Steve Johnson – Most score assists (11) in a match (Round 19, 2011)
 Joel Selwood – Most disposals (43) in a match at Kardinia Park (Round 19, 2011)
 First team in VFL/AFL history to win at least 17 regular season games in five consecutive seasons
 Most inside-50s in a match (80) (Round 20, 2011)
 First team to record 100 wins in a five-season span (2007–2011)
 first team to win consecutive games by 150 points or more.
 The consecutive wins in rounds 19 and 20, with a combined margin of 336 points, was the highest combined margin in consecutive wins of all time.
 In Round 19 against :
Geelong's final score of 37.11 (233) was the second-highest ever scored by Geelong, the second-highest score ever conceded by Melbourne, the highest score ever at Skilled Stadium, the fourth-highest score of all-time, and the highest score by any team since quarters were shortened to 20 minutes in 1994.
Geelong's final winning margin of 186 points was Geelong's highest ever, the highest ever at Skilled Stadium, the second-highest ever conceded by Melbourne, the second-highest of all-time, and the largest since quarters were shortened to 20 minutes in 1994.
Geelong's second quarter score of 12.1 (73) was the highest ever by Geelong, and the equal-highest ever conceded by Melbourne.
Geelong's leading margin at half-time of 114 points was the second-highest of all-time (the highest, 120 points, occurred in Round 8, 1993).
Geelong's half-time score of 20.4 (124) was the second-highest in Geelong's history, and the highest ever conceded by Melbourne.
Geelong's score of 37.11 featured 26 more goals than behinds, a new VFL/AFL record (the previous record of 23 was set by Geelong in Round 6, 2007).
Geelong recorded 510 disposals through the game, a new record.
Geelong became the first team to score more than fifty points in each of the four-quarters of a match.

 Other
 Jimmy Bartel – 2011 AFL Goal of the Year (Round 1 nomination)
 Jimmy Bartel – 2011 AFL Mark of the Year (Round 3 nomination)
 Mitch Duncan – 2011 AFL Rising Star (Round 3 nomination)
 Steve Johnson – 2011 AFL Mark of the Year (Round 4 nomination)
 Daniel Menzel – 2011 AFL Goal of the Year (Round 4 nomination)
 The seventh-round match against  marks the first time that twin brothers were opposing coaches, with Chris Scott (Geelong) coaching against Brad Scott. It was also only the third time in which brothers have coached against one another at VFL/AFL level.
 James Podsiadly – 2011 AFL Mark of the Year (Round 8 nomination)
 Nathan Vardy – 2011 AFL Mark of the Year (Round 11 nomination)
 Daniel Menzel – 2011 AFL Rising Star (Round 13 nomination)
 Steve Johnson – 2011 AFL Goal of the Year (Round 15 nomination)
 Allen Christensen – 2011 AFL Rising Star (Round 18 nomination)
 Shannon Byrnes – 2011 AFL Mark of the Year (Round 23 nomination)
 David Wojcinski – 2011 AFL Mark of the Year (Round 24 nomination)

Season statistics

Tribunal cases
 Updated as of Round 13, 2011 seasonVFL season

Squad
The 2011 VFL squad was named on 17 March 2011, consisting of 17 players. An additional four players were able to be listed until 30 June 2011, however, Geelong did not utilise these places. Senior and rookie-listed players for Geelong are also eligible for selection in VFL matches.

 Isaac Baker
 Jaxson Barham
 Anthony Biemans
 Mark Corrigan
 Mitchell Cuthill
 Anthony Elliott

 Matthew Firman
 Mitch Fisher
 Jack Hollmer
 Tommy Maas
 Andrew McLean
 Garreth Phillips

 Ben Raidme
 Troy Selwood
 Jack Shannahan
 Jackson Sheringham
 Casey Tutungi

Results

Notes
 Key H ^ Home match.
 A ^ Away match.

 General notes''
The Geelong-Gold Coast match at Skilled Stadium on 6 August was rescheduled from 2:10 pm to 1:40 pm in response to poor light at the previous weeks' game at the stadium. Consequently, the preceding VFL match was also rescheduled from 10:40 am to 10:10 am
"Points" refers to carry-over points accrued following the sanction. For example, 154.69 points draw a one-match suspension, with 54.69 carry-over points (for every 100 points, a one-match suspension is given).

References

External links
 Official website of the Geelong Football Club
 Official website of the Australian Football League 
 2011 season scores and results at AFL Tables
 2011 Geelong player statistics at AFL Tables

2011
Geelong Football Club